Emiliano Dumestre Guaraglia (born February 11, 1987 in Colonia del Sacramento) is a Uruguayan rower. He is a two-time medalist in the men's double and quadruple sculls at the 2010 South American Games in Medellín.

Dumestre represented Uruguay at the 2012 Summer Olympics in London, where he and his partner Rodolfo Collazo finished fourth in the C-final, and sixteenth overall in the men's lightweight double sculls, with a time of 6:51.94.

Dumestre is a graduate of agricultural studies at Universidad de la Empresa Business School in Montevideo.

References

External links

Uruguayan male rowers
Living people
Olympic rowers of Uruguay
Rowers at the 2012 Summer Olympics
People from Colonia del Sacramento
1987 births
Rowers at the 2011 Pan American Games
Rowers at the 2015 Pan American Games
South American Games gold medalists for Uruguay
South American Games silver medalists for Uruguay
South American Games medalists in rowing
Competitors at the 2010 South American Games
Pan American Games competitors for Uruguay
21st-century Uruguayan people